"Miracle" is a song by American singer Whitney Houston, it was released as the third single from her multi-platinum hit album I'm Your Baby Tonight on April 16, 1991 by Arista Records. It was written and produced by L.A. Reid and Babyface. The single reached number nine on the US Billboard Hot 100 (becoming her 13th top ten), two on the Hot R&B Singles Chart, and four on the Adult Contemporary Chart.

Composition 
During an interview with Jet Magazine on its June 14, 1991 issue, Houston said that she did not intend the song or the video to be about abortion: “I think about the air we breathe, the earth we live on. I think about our children. I think about a lot of things, things God put here for us to have, things that we need and we take for granted. I think all of these things are miracles and I think we should try to take better care of them,” she notes.

Critical reception 
Matthew Hocter from Albumism noted that on "Miracle", Houston was "returning to ballad territory". AllMusic editor Ashley S. Battel called it a high point of the album and praised the lyrics, "the powerful verses surrounding a love lost through one's own devices in 'Miracle.'" Billboard described it as a "soothing and romantic ballad", complimenting the singer's "warm and restrained vocal performance" as well as the "lush R&B arrangement". Entertainment Weekly editor David Browne called the melody of the song "indiscernible" and that the song itself is "nonentity." Rolling Stone editor James Hunter praised Houston's performance of the ballad, "when L.A. and Babyface follow her into ballad-land on the despondent "Miracle," Houston's own moods call the shots more clearly."

Chart performance 
"Miracle" entered The Billboard Hot 100 at 63, and stayed on the chart for 14 weeks. On the Radio & Records Airplay chart the single debuted at #39 on the December 4, 1991 issue, after four weeks on the chart it reached and peaked at #12 staying there for two weeks, the song stayed on the top 20 of the chart for five weeks and remained on it for nine weeks.

Music video 
The video shows Houston by herself in an empty studio singing the song. As she sings the first verse of the song, sad images of people facing prison sentences and living in poverty. During the second verse, the images shown gradually changes to a lighter tone with pictures of children growing up, the handicapped winning a competition, graduating school and enjoying their lives as young adults. The video ends with various pictures of children smiling.

Due to the manner of the music, it was widely believed that the song was about a girl who had an abortion, but later feels she made a mistake. Houston, however denied it during an interview with Jet magazine.

Track listing and formats 
US, 7"Vinyl, Cassette single
A1 "Miracle" — 5:43
B1 "After We Make Love" — 4:59
Japan, CD Mini single
 "Miracle" — 5:04
 "After We Make Love" — 4:59
Promo CD-Single
 "Miracle" (Radio edit) — 4:29

Personnel 
Whitney Houston – Lead vocals, background vocals
L.A. Reid, Babyface, Whitney Houston – Vocal arrangement
Donald Parks – Keyboard programming
Kayo – Bass
L.A. Reid, Babyface – Rhythm arrangement
Babyface – Keyboards
L.A. Reid – Drums, percussion

Production
Producers – L.A. Reid, Babyface 
Executive Producer – Clive Davis
Photography – Mark Bryan-Brown
Design – Susan Mendola
Recorded at Elumba Recording, Los Angeles, CA
Mixed at Studio LaCoCo, Atlanta, GA

Charts

Weekly charts

Year-end charts

References

External links 
 Miracle | WhitneyHouston Official Site
 Miracle at Discogs

Whitney Houston songs
1990 songs
Songs written by Babyface (musician)
Songs written by L.A. Reid
Contemporary R&B ballads
Song recordings produced by Babyface (musician)
Arista Records singles
1991 singles